Savity Lipenia  (born April 17, 1979) is a Congolese footballer currently under contract to the Israeli side Maccabi Ahi Nazareth.

Honours
Linafoot
Winner (1): 2004
Liga Leumit
Winner (2): 2008–09, 2013–14
Runner-up (1): 2005-06
Israel State Cup
Runner-up (1): 2014

References

External links
 - Reds

1979 births
Living people
Republic of the Congo footballers
Association football defenders
Expatriate footballers in Israel
Hakoah Maccabi Amidar Ramat Gan F.C. players
Hapoel Haifa F.C. players
Hapoel Nir Ramat HaSharon F.C. players
Maccabi Netanya F.C. players
Maccabi Ahi Nazareth F.C. players
Israeli Premier League players
Liga Leumit players